Paula Crespí Barriga (born 7 April 1998) is a Spanish female water polo player who won the silver medal at the 2017 World Championships in Budapest and at the 2019 World Championships in Gwangju.

See also
 List of World Aquatics Championships medalists in water polo

References

External links
 
 

Living people
1998 births
Sportspeople from L'Hospitalet de Llobregat
Spanish female water polo players
World Aquatics Championships medalists in water polo
Water polo players at the 2015 European Games
European Games medalists in water polo
European Games silver medalists for Spain
21st-century Spanish women